Events in the year 2022 in Japan.

Incumbents
Emperor: Naruhito
Prime Minister: Fumio Kishida
Chief Cabinet Secretary: Hirokazu Matsuno
Chief Justice of Japan: Naoto Ōtani
Speaker of the House of Representatives: Tadamori Ōshima
President of the House of Councillors:  Akiko Santō

Governors
Aichi Prefecture: Hideaki Omura
Akita Prefecture: Norihisa Satake
Aomori Prefecture: Shingo Mimura
Chiba Prefecture: Toshihito Kumagai
Ehime Prefecture: Tokihiro Nakamura
Fukui Prefecture: Tatsuji Sugimoto
Fukuoka Prefecture: Seitaro Hattori
Fukushima Prefecture: Masao Uchibori
Gifu Prefecture: Hajime Furuta
Gunma Prefecture: Ichita Yamamoto
Hiroshima Prefecture: Hidehiko Yuzaki
Hokkaido: Naomichi Suzuki
Hyogo Prefecture: Motohiko Saitō
Ibaraki Prefecture: Kazuhiko Ōigawa
Ishikawa: Masanori Tanimoto
Iwate Prefecture: Takuya Tasso
Kagawa Prefecture: Keizō Hamada
Kagoshima Prefecture: Kōichi Shiota
Kanagawa Prefecture: Yuji Kuroiwa
Kumamoto Prefecture: Ikuo Kabashima
Kochi Prefecture: Seiji Hamada
Kyoto Prefecture: Takatoshi Nishiwaki
Mie Prefecture: Eikei Suzuki
Miyagi Prefecture: Yoshihiro Murai
Miyazaki Prefecture: Shunji Kōno
Nagano Prefecture: Shuichi Abe
Nagasaki Prefecture: Hōdō Nakamura 
Nara Prefecture: Shōgo Arai
Niigata Prefecture: Hideyo Hanazumi
Oita Prefecture: Katsusada Hirose
Okayama Prefecture: Ryuta Ibaragi
Okinawa Prefecture: Denny Tamaki
Osaka Prefecture: Ichirō Matsui
Saga Prefecture: Yoshinori Yamaguchi
Saitama Prefecture: Motohiro Ōno
Shiga Prefecture: Taizō Mikazuki
Shimame Prefecture: Tatsuya Maruyama
Shizuoka Prefecture: Heita Kawakatsu
Tochigi Prefecture: Tomikazu Fukuda
Tokushima Prefecture: Kamon Iizumi
Tokyo Prefecture: Yuriko Koike
Tottori Prefecture: Shinji Hirai
Toyama Prefecture: Hachiro Nitta
Wakayama Prefecture: Yoshinobu Nisaka
Yamagata Prefecture: Mieko Yoshimura
Yamaguchi Prefecture: Tsugumasa Muraoka
Yamanashi Prefecture: Kotaro Nagasaki

Events
 Assassination of Shinzo Abe
 2022 monkeypox outbreak in Japan
 Japan–South Korea trade dispute

Predicted and scheduled events

January

January and February – winter thunderstorm and heavy snow. There were at least 93 human fatalities and 1,580 injuries, according to Japan Fire and Disaster Management Agency.
January 15 – According to a Tokyo Metropolitan Police Department report, a 1.7-decade-old student attacked 3 people with a knife outside of University of Tokyo, Bunkyo, Tokyo
January 22 – According to USGS report, a 6.3 magnitude earthquake hit near costal Saiki, Oita, southeastern Kyushu Island, followed by aftershocks. 13 people were wounded according to the Japan Fire and Disasters Management Agency.

February
Japanese athletes compete in the 2022 Winter Olympics in Beijing.
February 11 – A rice cracker confectionery manufacturing factory caught fire in Murakami, Niigata Prefecture, and six factory workers died.
February 27 – Former prime minister Shinzo Abe proposed that Japan should consider a nuclear sharing arrangement with the US similar to NATO. This includes housing American nuclear weapons on Japanese soil for deterrence. This plan comes in the wake of the 2022 Russian invasion of Ukraine.

March
March 16 – 2022 Fukushima earthquake

April
April 10 – In Nippon Professional Baseball (NPB), Chiba Lotte Marines pitcher Rōki Sasaki throws a perfect game, the first in 28 years and the 16th in NPB history. Sasaki tied an existing NPB record by striking out 19 batters, and set a new record by striking out 13 consecutive batters. 
April 23 – According to a Japan Coast Guard official confirmed report, a sightseeing ferry, Kazu I, sank nearby Shiretoko Peninsula, Hokkaido. In total, 26 people died.

May
May 3–5 – Many traditional Golden Week festivals that had been postponed due to the COVID-19 pandemic were held nationwide for the first time since 2019, including Hakata Dontaku, Hamamatsu Kite Festival, and Hiroshima Flower Festival, among others. 
May 9 – According to a Tokyo Firefighter Department official confirmed report, a house caught fire in Higashimurayama, Tokyo in an incident caused by suicide arson. Four people were killed in the fire.
May 11 – The Economic Security Promotion Law was enacted by the House of Councillors. This will be implemented in stages starting from April 2023.

June
June 2–3 – According to Japan Meteorological Agency and Japan Weather News Television official confirmed report, a massive hail fallen in Gunma, Saitama, Chiba Prefecture, according to Japan Fire and Disaster Management Agency report, 91 persons were hurt.
June 19 – According to USGS official confirmed report, a Richer scale 5.1 magnitude earthquake hit on Noto Peninsula, Ishikawa Prefecture, total seven persons were wounded, according to JFDMA official confirmed report. 
June 25 – According to Japan Meteorological Agency official confirmed report, a Celsius 40.2 degrees (Fahrenheit 104.36 degrees) high temperature record hit in Isesaki, Gunma Prefecture, as highest temperature record on June in Japan, since first observation record of JMA, since 1872, as same place another Celsius 40.0 (Fahrenheit 104.0 degrees) recorded observed on June 29.

July
 July 8 – Former prime minister Shinzo Abe is shot dead in an assassination in Nara, Kansai region.
 July 14 to August 16 – According to official confirmed report, a many summer traditional festival and event were resumed since 2019, due COVID-19 pandemic on worldwide, including to Akita Kantō, Aomori Nebuta, Tokushima Awa Dance Festival, Gion Festival and Gozan no Okuribi in both Kyoto, Gujo-Hachiman Bon Dance Festival, Hakata Gion Yamakasa and others, however, Osaka Tenjin Festival, Niigata Festival were scale down held, but Sumida River Firework Festival, Hachiōji Festival, Tanba Dekansho Dance Festival and Kumamoto Hinokuni Festival were not held for three consecutive years.

August
 August 13 – Tropical Thunderstorm Meari hits Shizuoka.
 August 22 – According to Japan National Police Agency official confirmed report, a regular route bus has overturned, following caught fire in Nagoya Expressway, Kita-ku, Nagoya, two persons were human fatalities and seven persons were wounded.

September
September 16–November 13 According to official confirmed report, a many autumn traditional festival resume in nationwide, including Kishiwada Danjiri Matsuri, Nada's Fighting Festival of Himeji, Saijō Festival of Ehime Prefecture, Aging Festival of Kyoto, Saga International Balloon Fiesta, Karatsu Kunchi, Chrysanthemum Doll event and Tochigi Autumn Festival, all of since 2019, however Kanuma Autumn Festival and Nagasaki Kunchi were cancelled for three consecutive years.    
September 17–20 – Typhoon Nanmadol, a heavy massive precipitation and landslide hit in southern Kyushu Island and other western Japan, total four persons were death and 147 persons injures, according to Japan Fire and Disaster Management Agency official confirmed report.
September 23–24 Typhoon Talas, a torrential massive heavy rain, landslide, flash flood hit, two transmission towers collapse hit in Shizuoka Prefecture, total three persons were human fatalities, six persons wounded, according to JFDMA official confirmed report.
September 28 to December 31 – According to the Ministry of the Environment's official report, 143 cases of wild birds on nationwide, as crows, cranes, and swans were confirmed, and the Tobu Zoological Park in Saitama Prefecture, where many wild birds were confirmed, was closed from December 22, and the amusement area has resumed on December 29.

October
October 9 – Racing driver Max Verstappen wins Japanese Grand Prix. Second title world champion 2022 Formula One World Championship.
October 11 – COVID-19 travel restrictions was officially lifted up in Japan on fully vaccinated travelers.
October 28 to December 31 – According to a report by the Ministry of Agriculture, Forestry and Fisheries, 50 cases of bird flu have been reported in Japan in chickens and ducks raised on poultry farms in nationwide, total 7.63 millions sluggered by Japan Ground Self-Defense Force.

November
November 1 – Ghibli Park, owned by Studio Ghibli, officially opens in Nagakute, Aichi Prefecture.

December
December 25 – According to Japan National Police Agency official confirmed report, a suspect has three murdered with hammer in Hannō, Saitama Prefecture, a suspicion has arrested on same day,
December 27 – According to Tokyo Fire Department official confirmed report, a fire and explosion occurred at a chemical factory and warehouse in Sumida, Tokyo, destroying 10 facilities and buildings, an employee has injures.
December 29 – According to the latest report from the Ministry of Health, Labour and Welfare, 420 people died in a single day, relative for fatalities number of COVID-19 in nationwide, since the first of the pandemics, surpassing the record of 415 on December 28 on 2022 relative.

Arts and entertainment
2022 in anime
2022 in Japanese music
2022 in Japanese television
List of 2022 box office number-one films in Japan
List of Japanese films of 2022

Sports
 September 11 – 2022 FIA World Endurance Championship is held at 2022 6 Hours of Fuji
 September 25 – 2022 MotoGP World Championship is held at 2022 Japanese motorcycle Grand Prix
 October 9 – 2022 Formula One World Championship is held at 2022 Japanese Grand Prix
 2022 F4 Japanese Championship
 2022 Super Formula Championship
 2022 Super Formula Lights
 2022 Super GT Series
 2022 EAFF E-1 Football Championship (Japan)
 2022 in Japanese football
 2022 J1 League
 2022 J2 League
 2022 J3 League
 2022 Japan Football League
 2022 Japanese Regional Leagues
 2022 Japanese Super Cup
 2022 Emperor's Cup
 2022 J.League Cup

Deaths

January
January 8 – Kazuo Takahashi, politician (b. 1930)
January 9
 Toshiki Kaifu, politician (b. 1931)
 Akira Inoue, film director (b. 1928)
January 10 – Shinji Mizushima, manga artist (b. 1939)
January 29 – Kohei Yoshiyuki, photographer (b. 1946)

February
February 1 – Shintaro Ishihara, politician and writer (b. 1932)
February 8 – Toshiya Ueda, voice actor (b. 1933)
February 20 – Teruhiko Saigō, singer and actor (b. 1947)
February 26 – Yūsuke Kawazu, actor (b. 1935)
February 28 – Norihiro Inoue, actor (b. 1958)

March
March 3 – Kyotaro Nishimura, novelist (b. 1930)
March 5 – Taro Shigaki, actor (b. 1951)
March 14 – Akira Takarada, actor (b. 1934)
March 16 – Kunimitsu Takahashi, former professional motorcycle, racing driver and team manager (b. 1940)
March 17 – Tadao Sato, film critic (b. 1930)
March 21 – Shinji Aoyama, film director (b. 1964)
March 31 – Kei Yamamoto, actor (b. 1940)

April
April 7 – Fujiko A. Fujio, manga artist (b. 1934)
April 8 – Minori Matsushima, voice actress (b. 1940)
April 18 – Shirō Sasaki, film producer (b. 1939)
April 19 – Kane Tanaka, supercentenarian (oldest verified Japanese person and the second oldest verified person ever) (b. 1903)

May
May 3 – Hiroyuki Watanabe, actor (b. 1955)
May 11 – Ryuhei Ueshima, comedian (b. 1961)
May 14 – Ryo Kawamura, television announcer (b. 1967)
May 22 – Takashi Ishii, film director (b. 1946)

June
June 2 – Nobuyuki Idei, businessman (b. 1937)
June 4 – Hajime Ishii, politician (b. 1934)
June 11 – Kumiko Takizawa, voice actress (b. 1952)
June 23 – Chumei Watanabe, composer (b. 1925)
June 27
Teruyoshi Nakano, special effects director (b. 1935)
Yuki Katsuragi, singer (b. 1949)
June 28 – Asao Sano, actor (b. 1925)

July
July 1 – Akiko Nomura, actress (b. 1927)
July 6 – Kazuki Takahashi, manga artist (b. 1961)
July 8 – Shinzo Abe, politician (b. 1954)
July 10 – Hirohisa Fujii, politician (b. 1932)
July 16 – Wakanohana Kanji II, sumo wrestler (b. 1953)
July 25 – Yoko Shimada, actress (b. 1953)
July 30 – Kiyoshi Kobayashi, voice actor (b. 1933)

August
August 1 – Hiroshi Ōtake, voice actor (b. 1932)
August 5 – Issei Miyake, fashion designer (b. 1938)
August 9 – Akiko Shimamura, actress (b. 1933)
August 11 – Hanae Mori, fashion designer (b. 1926)
August 17 – Motomu Kiyokawa, voice actor (b. 1935)
August 20 –Tokihisa Morikawa, film director (b. 1929)
August 23 – Ikko Furuya, actor (b. 1944)
August 24 – Kazuo Inamori, businessman (b. 1932)
August 27 – 2nd Kinō Sanyūtei (4th Sanyūtei Kinba, Tatsunori Matsumoto), rakugo storyteller, (b. 1929)
August 28 – Masahiro Kobayashi, film director (b. 1954)

September
September 25 – Masaaki Ikenaga, former professional baseball pitcher (b. 1946)
September 27 – Shinjirō Ehara, actor (b. 1936)
September 28 – Masayoshi Takemura, politician (former Governor of Shiga and Chief Cabinet Secretary) (b. 1934)
September 30 – San'yūtei Enraku VI, Rakugo comedian (b. 1950)

October
October 1 – Antonio Inoki, professional wrestler (b. 1943)
October 4 – Shigeki Tanaka, marathon and long-distance runner (b. 1931)
October 5 – Shinsuke Chikaishi, voice actor (b. 1931)
October 12 – Katsuya Kitamura, professional wrestler and bodybuilder (b. 1985)
October 19 – Kōji Nakamoto, comedian (b. 1941)
October 21 – Masato Kudo, football player (b. 1990)

November
November 1 – Tsuneo Fukuhara, composer (b. 1932)
November 11 – Choji Murata, baseball player (b. 1949)
November 14 – Kiyoyuki Yanada, voice actor (b. 1965)
November 15 – Shigeru Nakamura, supercentenarian in Japan  (as November 2022) (b. 1911)
November 27 – Yoichi Sai, film director (b. 1949)
November 28 – Toru Watanabe, actor (b. 1951)

December
December 6 – Ichirou Mizuki, singer (b. 1948)
December 8 – Yoshishige Yoshida, film director (b. 1933)
December 14 – Kōji Tsukasa, musician (b. 1962)
December 17 – Yūji Tanaka, drummer, musician (b. 1957)
December 20 – Chika Takami, actress (b. 1962)
December 28 – Arata Isozaki, architecter (b. 1931)

See also

Country overviews

 Japan
 History of Japan
 Outline of Japan
 Government of Japan
 Politics of Japan
 Years in Japan
 Timeline of Japanese history

Related timelines for current period

 2022
 2020s
 2020s in political history

References

External links
 

 
Japan
Japan
2020s in Japan
Years of the 21st century in Japan